Barry Sonnenfeld  (born April 1, 1953) is an American filmmaker and television director. He originally worked as a cinematographer for the Coen brothers before directing films such as The Addams Family (1991) and its sequel Addams Family Values (1993), Get Shorty (1995), the Men in Black trilogy (1997–2012), and Wild Wild West (1999).

Early life
Sonnenfeld was born and raised in New York City, the son of Irene "Kelly" (Kellerman), an art teacher, and Sonny Sonnenfeld, a lighting salesman, educator, and architectural lighting designer. He was raised in a Jewish family. After he received his bachelor's degree from Hampshire College, he graduated from New York University Film School in 1978.

Career
He began working on pornographic films before starting work as director of photography on the Oscar-nominated In Our Water (1982). Then Joel Coen and Ethan Coen hired him for Blood Simple (1984). This film began his collaboration with the Coen brothers, who used him for their next two pictures, Raising Arizona (1987) and Miller's Crossing (1990). He also worked with Danny DeVito on Throw Momma from the Train (1987) and Rob Reiner on When Harry Met Sally... (1989) and Misery (1990).

Sonnenfeld gained his first work as a director from Paramount Pictures on The Addams Family, a box-office success released in November 1991. Its sequel, Addams Family Values (1993), was not as successful at the box office, but he received critical acclaim for his fourth directorial outing, Get Shorty (1995). Produced by Jersey Films and based on a novel by Elmore Leonard, the film won a Golden Globe for John Travolta (Best Actor in a Comedy or Musical). The film was also entered into the 46th Berlin International Film Festival. Following Tim Burton and the Coen brothers, Sonnenfeld's films would tell stories about unusual and unorthodox people who are into the unexpected and the strange. His films would often use his trademark filmmaking techniques such as his unusual camera angles, offbeat dialogue and, in certain films, strange behavior and weird creatures.

In 1996, Steven Spielberg asked him to direct Men in Black (1997). Starring Tommy Lee Jones and Will Smith, the film was a critical and financial success. In 1998, Jon Peters asked him to direct Wild Wild West (1999). Starring Smith and Kevin Kline, the film was a critical and financial flop. He also directed the comedy Big Trouble (2002), after which he made his most successful film sequel to that point, Men in Black II (2002). He is also a contributing editor for Esquire. He also co-produced (alongside his partner Barry Josephson) the 2007 film Enchanted for Walt Disney Pictures that starred Amy Adams. In 2008, Sonnenfeld earned an Emmy for directing Pushing Daisies. Sonnenfeld returned for Men in Black 3; released in 2012, the third installment received positive reviews and became the highest-grossing film in the series worldwide. In 2007, his Right Coast production company has been signed with Sony.

His memoir, Barry Sonnenfeld, Call Your Mother: Memoirs of a Neurotic Filmmaker, was published by Hachette Books in 2020.

Personal life
Sonnenfeld lives in Pemberton, British Columbia with his wife Susan.

In 1999, he was unhurt in a plane crash at Van Nuys Airport, when his business jet veered off the runway upon landing, crashing into five parked planes.

Filmography

Film

As cinematographer

As actor

Television

TV series

Producer
 Karen Sisco (2004) (1 episode)

As cinematographer

Acting roles

TV movies

As cinematographer
 How to Be a Perfect Person in Just Three Days  (1983)
 Classified Love (1986)
 Welcome Home, Bobby (1986)

Future projects
He is working on new projects, among them include Things a Man Should Never Do Past 30: a single-camera comedy from executive producer/director Sonnenfeld, the Tannenbaum Company and Sony Pictures Television. The project mostly is based on the personal experiences of Esquire writer David Katz and Esquire editor at large A. J. Jacobs. The show is about a man working at a men's magazine who is reluctant to embrace adulthood and his friend who is an immersion journalist. Al Higgins (Malcolm in the Middle) is set to serve as showrunner/head writer if the project is picked up.

He has become attached to a movie adaptation of The Spellman Files by Lisa Lutz, about a family of private investigators. Sonnenfeld will direct the movie adaptation of the fantasy novel Gil's All Fright Diner in partnership with DreamWorks Animation. He is also developing a sitcom for ABC, Funny in Farsi, based on the book of the same name.

In 2012, it was stated that he was appointed to direct Lore, an adaptation based on the comic by T.P. Louise and Ashley Wood of the same name. But, in 2013, Indie director Dave Green has signed on to replace Barry Sonnenfeld as director, Sonnenfeld will take part as executive producer on the project.

Barry is also in talks with Warner Bros. to make a live action film adaptation of the DC Comics characters, The Metal Men. Sonnenfeld also agreed to direct the Beverly Hills Cop pilot for CBS and serve as an executive producer as well. However, Paramount Pictures dropped the idea in favor of a fourth film directed by Mark Molloy.

References

External links
 
 
 

1953 births
American cinematographers
Action film directors
Science fiction film directors
American television directors
Television producers from New York City
Hampshire College alumni
Living people
Film directors from New York City
Primetime Emmy Award winners
Directors Guild of America Award winners
Tisch School of the Arts alumni
Esquire (magazine) people
Comedy film directors